Church Hill is an archaeological site, of the Neolithic and Bronze Age periods, in West Sussex, England. It is a scheduled monument.

Description

Flint mine
There is a group of about 36 infilled shafts of a flint mine; the ground has been levelled by modern cultivation, but the shafts are visible on aerial photographs. There was excavation by John Pull during 1932–1939 and 1945–1949; he excavated six shafts. There was further investigation during 1984–1986.

There were pottery sherds at the shaft bottoms, from the Late Neolithic period and Early to Middle Bronze Age.

This is one of several flint mines in the area; others known nearby are at Blackpatch and Cissbury (both investigated by John Pull), and on Harrow Hill.

Bowl barrow
A bowl barrow, largely levelled by modern ploughing, is situated in the south-east of the area of the mine, partly over an infilled mine shaft. A beaker, with a cremation with two flint-axes, was discovered in the infilled shaft, showing continuation of the site into the Beaker period.

References

Scheduled monuments in West Sussex
Bronze Age sites in West Sussex
Archaeological sites in West Sussex
Prehistoric mines
Hills of West Sussex
Worthing